Aegiphila is a genus of flowering plants in the mint family, Lamiaceae, first described in 1763. It was formerly classified in the Verbenaceae. It is native to Mexico, Central America, South America, the West Indies, and Florida.

Species:
Aegiphila aculeifera Moldenke - Colombia
Aegiphila alba Moldenke - Colombia, Ecuador, Peru
Aegiphila anomala Pittier - Colombia, Panama, Costa Rica
Aegiphila aracaensis Aymard & Cuello - Serra do Aracá in the State of Amazonas in Brazil
Aegiphila arcta Moldenke - Yaracuy State in Venezuela
 Aegiphila australis  Moldenke - Santa Catarina in Brazil
Aegiphila bogotensis (Spreng.) Moldenke - Colombia, Ecuador, Venezuela
Aegiphila boliviana Moldenke - Ecuador, Peru, Bolivia
 Aegiphila brachiata Vell. - Brazil, Argentina, Bolivia, Paraguay, Uruguay
 Aegiphila bracteolosa Moldenke - Guyana, Venezuela, Bolivia, Colombia, Peru, northwestern Brazil 
Aegiphila brenesii Hammel - Costa Rica
Aegiphila breviflora (Rusby) Moldenke - Bolivia
Aegiphila buchtienii Moldenke - Bolivia
Aegiphila candelabrum Briq - Brazil, Argentina, Paraguay
Aegiphila capitata Moldenke - São Paulo
Aegiphila casseliiformis Schauer  - southeastern Brazil
Aegiphila catatumbensis Moldenke - Venezuela
Aegiphila caucensis Moldenke - Colombia, Peru
 Aegiphila caymanensis Moldenke - Grand Cayman Island
Aegiphila cephalophora Standl. - Panama, Costa Rica
Aegiphila chrysantha Hayek - Bolivia, Peru, Ecuador, Brazil
Aegiphila conturbata Moldenke - eastern Brazil
 Aegiphila cordata Poepp. - Ecuador, Colombia, Peru, northwestern Brazil 
  Aegiphila cordifolia (Ruiz y Pavón) Moldenke - Peru, Ecuador
†Aegiphila coriacea Moldenke - Brazil; probably extinct
Aegiphila costaricensis Moldenke - southern Mexico, Central America, Colombia, Venezuela
Aegiphila cuatrecasasii Moldenke - Ecuador, Colombia
Aegiphila cuneata Moldenke - Peru, Ecuador, Acre State in Brazil
Aegiphila dentata Moldenke - southeastern Brazil
 Aegiphila deppeana Steud. - central + southern Mexico, Central America, Colombia, Venezuela, French Guiana
Aegiphila duckei Moldenke - State of Amazonas in Brazil
Aegiphila elata Sw. - Florida, southern Mexico, Central America, Cayman Islands, Cuba, Hispaniola, Jamaica, Puerto Rico, Trinidad, Lesser Antilles, Guianas, Colombia, Venezuela, Bolivia, Peru, Ecuador, Brazil
Aegiphila elegans Moldenke - Ecuador, Bolivia, Peru, northwestern Brazil 
Aegiphila elongata Moldenke - Ecuador
Aegiphila exiguiflora Moldenke - Pará State in Brazil
 Aegiphila falcata Donn.Sm - Chiapas, Guatemala, Honduras, Costa Rica, Panama 
Aegiphila farinosa Moldenke - Colombia
 Aegiphila fasciculata J.D. Smith - Guatemala, Honduras, Nicaragua
Aegiphila fendleri Moldenke - Venezuela, Amapá State in Brazil
 Aegiphila ferruginea Hayek & Spruce - Ecuador
Aegiphila filipes Mart. & Schauer - Costa Rica, Panama, Colombia, Venezuela, Bolivia, Peru, Ecuador, northwestern Brazil
Aegiphila floribunda Moritz & Moldenke - Colombia, Venezuela
 Aegiphila fluminensis Vell. - southeastern Brazil
 Aegiphila foetida Sw. - Jamaica
Aegiphila froesii Moldenke - State of Amazonas in Brazil
Aegiphila glabrata Moldenke - Peru
 Aegiphila glomerata Benth. - Ecuador
Aegiphila gloriosa Moldenke - Pará, Bahia
Aegiphila goeldiana Huber & Moldenke - Pará
Aegiphila goudotiana Moldenke - Cundinamarca in Colombia
Aegiphila grandis Moldenke - Colombia, Venezuela, Ecuador
Aegiphila graveolens Mart. & Schauer - eastern Brazil
Aegiphila hastingsiana Moldenke - Guatemala
Aegiphila haughtii Moldenke - Peru, Ecuador
Aegiphila herzogii Moldenke  - Bolivia
Aegiphila hirsuta Moldenke - Bolivia
Aegiphila hirsutissima Moldenke - Colombia, Venezuela, Panama
Aegiphila hoehnei Moldenke - Venezuela, Panama, Peru, Ecuador, northwestern Brazil
Aegiphila hystricina Aymard & Cuello - Venezuela, Amapá State in Brazil
 Aegiphila insignis Moldenke - Peru
 Aegiphila integrifolia (Jacq.) B.D.Jacks. - widespread from Panama and Trinidad to Bolivia
Aegiphila intermedia Moldenke- Venezuela, Brazil
Aegiphila killipii Moldenke - Colombia
 Aegiphila laeta Kunth - Colombia, Ecuador, Venezuela, Panama
 Aegiphila laevis (Aubl.) J.F.Gmel. - Colombia, Guianas, Venezuela, Brazil
Aegiphila lanata Moldenke - Brazil
Aegiphila laxiflora Benth - Trinidad, Venezuela, Guyana
Aegiphila lehmannii Moldenke - Colombia, Ecuador
Aegiphila lewisiana Moldenke - Venezuela
 Aegiphila lhotskiana Cham. - Suriname, French Guiana, Brazil, Bolivia, Paraguay
Aegiphila longifolia Turcz - northwestern Brazil, Colombia, Guyana
Aegiphila longipetiolata Moldenke - Peru
 Aegiphila lopez-palacii Moldenke - Ecuador
Aegiphila loretensis Moldenke - Peru
 Aegiphila luschnathii Schauer  - Brazil
Aegiphila macrantha Ducke - Brazil, Guianas, Venezuela, Trinidad
 Aegiphila martinicensis Jacq. - Chiapas, Central America, West Indies, Trinidad, Venezuela, Colombia
Aegiphila mattogrossensis Moldenke - Mato Grosso
 Aegiphila mediterranea Vell. - Brazil, Paraguay, Misiones Province in Argentina
Aegiphila medullosa Moldenke - Rio de Janeiro
 Aegiphila membranacea Turcz. - Guianas, northwestern Brazil, Bolivia, Venezuela, Colombia, Ecuador, Peru
Aegiphila microcalycina Moldenke - Roraima
Aegiphila minasensis Moldenke - Minas Gerais
Aegiphila moldenkeana López-Pal. - Venezuela
 Aegiphila mollis Kunth  - Nicaragua, Costa Rica, Colombia, Ecuador, Peru, northwestern Brazil, Venezuela, Panama, 
 Aegiphila monstrosa Moldenke - southern Mexico, Central America
 Aegiphila montanaMoldenke - Colombia
 Aegiphila monticola Moldenke - Ecuador
Aegiphila mortonii Moldenke - Peru
 Aegiphila multiflora Ruiz & Pav. - Peru, Ecuador, Bolivia
Aegiphila narinensis Rueda - Colombia, Ecuador
 Aegiphila nervosa Urb. - Jamaica, Hispaniola
Aegiphila novofrifurgensis Moldenke - southeastern Brazil
Aegiphila novogranatensis Moldenke - Colombia, Ecuador, Venezuela
 Aegiphila obducta Vell. - southern Brazil
Aegiphila obovata Andrews - Trinidad & Tobago
 Aegiphila obtusa Urb. - Jamaica
Aegiphila odontophylla Donn.Sm. - Panama, Costa Rica, Colombia, Venezuela
Aegiphila ovata Moldenke - Peru, Bolivia
  Aegiphila panamensis Moldenke - southern Mexico, Central America, Colombia, Ecuador, Peru, northwestern Brazil, Venezuela
Aegiphila paraguariensis Briq. - Brazil, Paraguay
Aegiphila paranensis Moldenke - Paraguay
Aegiphila parviflora Moldenke - Venezuela, Brazil
Aegiphila pavoniana Moldenke - Ecuador
Aegiphila pennellii Moldenke - Tolima region of  Colombia
Aegiphila pernambucensis Moldenke - eastern Brazil
Aegiphila perplexa Moldenke - Trinidad & Tobago, Venezuela
Aegiphila peruviana Turcz. - Ecuador, Peru, Bolivia
 Aegiphila plicata Urb. - Jamaica
Aegiphila pulcherrima Moldenke - Peru
  Aegiphila purpurascens Moldenke - Ecuador
Aegiphila quararibeana Rueda - Costa Rica
 Aegiphila quinduensis (Kunth) Moldenke - Colombia, Venezuela
 Aegiphila racemosa Vell. - Brazil, Guianas, Colombia, Venezuela, Ecuador
 Aegiphila riedeliana Schauer - Brazil
 Aegiphila rimbachii Moldenke - Ecuador
Aegiphila roraimensis Moldenke - Guyana, Venezuela
Aegiphila saltensis Legname - Salta Province of Argentina
Aegiphila salticola Moldenke - Brazil
Aegiphila scandens Moldenke - Apure State of Venezuela, northwestern Brazil
 Aegiphila schimpffii Moldenke - Ecuador
 Aegiphila sellowiana Cham. - Bolivia, Peru, Brazil, Paraguay, Misiones Province of Argentina
Aegiphila setiformis Rusby - Bolivia
 Aegiphila skutchii Moldenke - southern Mexico, Guatemala, Honduras, Nicaragua 
Aegiphila smithii Moldenke - Peru
 Aegiphila sordida Moldenke - Bolivia, Peru
Aegiphila spicata (Rusby) Moldenke - Bolivia, Peru
Aegiphila spruceana Moldenke - Peru, Colombia, Venezuela, northwestern Brazil
Aegiphila standleyi Moldenke - Costa Rica
Aegiphila steinbachii Moldenke - Bolivia
Aegiphila sufflava Moldenke - Ecuador, Peru
Aegiphila swartziana Urb. - Jamaica
Aegiphila sylvatica Moldenke - Colombia
 Aegiphila ternifolia  (Kunth) Moldenke - Colombia, Venezuela
 Aegiphila trifida Sw. - Jamaica
Aegiphila truncata Moldenke - Colombia
Aegiphila uasadiana J.R.Grande - Venezuela
Aegiphila ulei (Hayek) B.Walln. - Colombia, Ecuador, Brazil
Aegiphila umbraculiformis Moldenke - Peru
Aegiphila uniflora Urb. - Jamaica
Aegiphila valerioi Standl. - southern Mexico, Costa Rica, Nicaragua, Panama
Aegiphila vallensis Moldenke - Colombia
Aegiphila velutinosa Moldenke - Peru
Aegiphila venezuelensis Moldenke - Venezuela
 Aegiphila verticillata Vell. - Brazil, Paraguay
Aegiphila villosa (Aubl.) J.F.Gmel - Brazil, Guianas
 Aegiphila vitelliniflora Klotzsch - Brazil, Bolivia, Peru, Paraguay
Aegiphila volubilis Moldenke - Ecuador, Peru
Aegiphila wigandioides Lundell - Chiapas

References

 
Taxonomy articles created by Polbot
Lamiaceae genera
Taxa named by Nikolaus Joseph von Jacquin